Ronald W. Osborne BA, FCA (11 May 1946 – 9 April 2013), also known as Ron Osborne, was an English-born Canadian executive, who was involved mainly with media organizations.

Life and career
Born in Ashington, Sussex, England and graduated from Cambridge University in 1968, majoring in modern languages. Osborne was initially an accountant in his early career after becoming a chartered accountant in 1972. Osborne left Britain to work for Clarkson Gordon & Co in Toronto and later in Rio de Janeiro in 1976.

From 1981 to 1994, he was with Maclean Hunter becoming the head of the media company in 1986. Osborne left after Rogers Communications acquired Maclean Hunter. In 1995, Osborne went to BCE Inc as COO and then with Bell Canada as president and CEO. In 1997 he left the private sector to join Ontario Hydro and later as president and CEO of Ontario Power Generation after the breakup of Ontario Hydro.

In his later years he was with Postmedia as chair in 2010 and was director of various other companies.

Osborne died in his home in Florida at age 66 and is buried in Mount Pleasant Cemetery in Toronto.

References

English emigrants to Canada
Alumni of the University of Cambridge
1947 births
2013 deaths